KKMI (93.5 FM) is a radio station licensed to serve Burlington, Iowa, United States.  The station is owned by Pritchard Broadcasting Corporation.

KKMI broadcasts an adult contemporary music format to the greater Burlington area.

The station was assigned the KKMI call sign by the Federal Communications Commission on September 9, 1991.

References

External links
KKMI official website

KMI
Mainstream adult contemporary radio stations in the United States
Radio stations established in 1981
Burlington, Iowa